Hastula stylata, common name the wide-mouth auger, is a species of sea snail, a marine gastropod mollusk in the family Terebridae, the auger snails.

Description
The length of the shell varies between 15 mm and 50 mm.

Distribution
This marine species occurs off Mauritius, Japan and Easter Island; not off Hawaii.

References

 Bratcher T. & Cernohorsky W.O. (1987). Living terebras of the world. A monograph of the recent Terebridae of the world. American Malacologists, Melbourne, Florida & Burlington, Massachusetts. 240pp

External links
 Hinds R.B. (1844). Descriptions of new shells, collected during the voyage of the Sulphur, and in Mr. Cuming's late visit to the Philippines. Proceedings of the Zoological Society of London. 11 (1844): 149–168
 Fedosov, A. E.; Malcolm, G.; Terryn, Y.; Gorson, J.; Modica, M. V.; Holford, M.; Puillandre, N. (2020). Phylogenetic classification of the family Terebridae (Neogastropoda: Conoidea). Journal of Molluscan Studies. 85(4): 359-388
 Gastropods.com: Impages stylata

Terebridae
Gastropods described in 1844